Óscar Rubén Salomón is a politician from Paraguay who is serving as President of the Senate of Paraguay.

Personal life 
He was born in June 3, 1957 and he served as President of Senate in 1993 to 1998 and 2013 to 2023.

References 

1957 births
Paraguayan politicians
Living people